The 1909 season was the second in which the Eastern Suburbs DRLFC  competed in the New South Wales Rugby Football League competition. They finished the regular season in 4th (of 8) position, before being knocked out in the semi-final by Balmain.

Players

Season

 Premiership round 5, Saturday 29 May 1909.
Eastern Suburbs 18 defeated Newcastle Rebels 16 at the Newcastle Sports Ground. 
Described this way "As an exhibition the game was all that could have been desired It was fast, open, exciting and even."

 Premiership round 9, Saturday 17 July 1909.
Balmain 24 (Apploney 2, Moore 2, Halloway, Regent Tries; Fitzpatrick 3 Goals) defeated Eastern Suburbs 15 (M. Frawley, Kelley, Webb Tries; Surridge 2, King Goals) at the Agricultural Society's Ground.
This was reported to be a particularly rough affair, Easts lost a player early in the match through injury, and two more players were severely concussed, Four were sent off for fighting, and a fifth, Easts captain Larry O'Malley was sent off for kicking.

Ladder

Semi-final

 Premiership Semi-final, Saturday 14 August 1909.

Balmain 15 (Walker 2, Edwards, Graves, Regent tries) defeated Eastern Suburbs 8 (Lenton, Surridge tries; King goal) at the Wentworth Park Ground in front of around 3,000 spectators.

Balmain were never in any danger of defeat, both Easts tries came late in the match with Balmain already leading by 15 points.

The lineups were-

Eastern Suburbs: 
Bill King • William Lenton
• Sid Kaufman 
• Percy McNamara
• Les Abott
• Harry Flegg
• Tom Bruce
• Mick Frawley
• F. Denholm 
• Arthur Surridge 
• Arthur Hennessy (c) 
• Harold Kelley 
• Sid Pearce

Balmain: F. Wooley 
• W. Smith 
• A. Walker
• A. Latta
• A Fitzpatrick  
• Arthur Halloway 
• L. Edwards 
• F. Woodward
• B. Graves  
• J. Regent (c) 
• F. Ward
• T. McFadyen
• J. Appoloney

Point analysis

Offence

The lowdown:
Eastern Suburbs completed the following score options in the 1908 season:

37 tries
32 goals
0 field goals

The result:

Eastern Suburbs scored a total of 167 points in 1909.

The verdict:

 Eastern Suburbs try scoring ability dropped by 26% on their previous season.
 Eastern Suburbs goal scoring ability dropped by 3% on their previous season.
 Eastern Suburbs field goal kicking ability dropped by 100% on their previous season.
 Eastern Suburbs overall point scoring ability dropped by 16.8% on their previous season.
 Eastern Suburbs total point score dropped by 8.74% on their previous season.

Defence

The lowdown:

Eastern Suburbs conceded the following score options in the 1909 season:

38 tries
21 goals
0 field goals

The result:

Eastern Suburbs conceded a total of 141 points in 1909.

The verdict:

 Eastern Suburbs try scoring defence dropped by 26.3% on their previous season.
 Eastern Suburbs goal kicking defence dropped by 28.5% on their previous season.
 Eastern Suburbs field goal defence was maintained on their previous season.
 Eastern Suburbs overall defense dropped by 27.1% on their previous season.
 Eastern Suburbs total points against defensive effort dropped by 34% on their previous season.

Season summary

 Eastern Suburbs made the semi-finals.
 Eastern Suburbs again won the reserve grade competition.
 Australian representatives:- Dave Brown, Dan Frawley, Mick Frawley, Larry O'Malley, Sandy Pearce and Johnno Stuntz.
  Larry O'Malley became the second Australian captain to come from the Eastern Suburbs club.

Notes

 Many of Eastern Suburbs leading players (particularly those who had gone away on the previous year's Kangaroo tour) had taken up contracts with English rugby league clubs . Missing much of the backend of the season. Excerpts from English rugby league club Warrington Wolves's 1909/10 yearbook show that Dan Frawley, Johno Stuntz and Larry O'Malley all played with that club in the 1909/10 English season. It also reveals that they had telegrammed Dally Messenger attempting to sign both he and Sid Pearce. Another Eastern Suburbs player, Albert Rosenfeld, signed with Huddlesfied where he became one of English rugby league greatest try scorers.
 Dally Messenger took no part in 1909 Eastern Suburbs season.

References

External links
Rugby League Tables and Statistics
 Ian Heads, True Blue - the true story of the NSW Rugby League,

Sydney Roosters seasons
Eastern Suburbs season
East